The Pink Lincolns are a punk rock band formed in Tampa, Florida in 1986 by vocalist Chris Barrows and guitarist Dorsey Martin. The rest of the lineup has frequently changed and currently includes bassist Kevin Coss and drummer Jeff Fox. The band has released five studio albums, one live album and six EP's as well as splits with Screeching Weasel and The Queers. The cover for the band's album Suck and Bloat was drawn by Iggy Pop, and their album Pure Swank was produced by Bill Stevenson of The Descendents. Notable songs include "Velvet Elvis", a story about a squabble over a velvet painting of Elvis Presley.

Members
Current as of 2019
Chris Barrows - vocals (1986–present)
Kevin Coss - bass
Jeff Fox - drums

Past members
John Yovino- guitar
Paul Moroz- drums
Paul Johnston - guitar
Griff Draycott - drums
Chris Lunceford - bass
Fred Stoltz - drums
Jim Belogna - bass
Dorsey Martin - guitar

Discography

Studio albums

Live albums

EPs

Split EPs

Compilations

Other contributions
1987: Have-A-Tampa (Pop Records)
1992: Blame and Burn (Flush Records)
1994: Punk USA (Lookout! Records)
1995: Water Music (Just Add Water Records)
1996: Welcome to Florida... (Stiff Pole Records)
1996: Rational Enquirer (Rational Inquirer)
1997: More Bounce to The Ounce (Lookout! Records)
1997: Show and Tell - A Stormy Remembrance of TV Theme Tunes (Which Records?)
1999: My So Called Punk Rock Life (Melted Records)
1999: V.M.L. Live (Liberation Records)
2008: Goodbye Sanity EP by Teenage Rehab (Jailhouse Records) - Chris Barrows guest vocals
2009: Let's Be Enemies by Teenage Rehab(Jailhouse Records) - Chris Barrows lyric contributions
2009: People Are Bad by The Spears (Jailhouse Records) - Chris Barrows vocalist
2009: Shove by The Spears (Jailhouse Records) - Chris Barrows vocalist

See also
Punk rock

Further reading
The Pink Lincolns Discography at Allmusic

References

External links 
 PinkLincolns.com
 Current Record Label Site
 Punknews.org Profile

Punk rock groups from Florida
24 Hour Service Station artists
Musical groups from Tampa, Florida